Gordon Arthur (born 30 May 1958) is a Scottish former footballer, who played as a goalkeeper for a number of Scottish clubs.

Beginning his senior career with Dundee in 1975, Arthur failed to make a first-team appearance and moved to Stirling Albion in 1977, featuring in nearly 200 league matches for The Binos before moving to Dumbarton in 1984. Arthur was a first-team regular in his four years at Boghead and moved to hometown club Raith Rovers in 1988. In six years at Stark's Park, Arthur played in over 150 league matches, tasting promotion to the Premier Division when the club won the Scottish First Division championship in 1992–93. A move to Forfar Athletic beckoned in 1994 following Raith's relegation and after playing in just under 100 league games for them, including winning the 1994–95 Scottish Third Division, Arthur saw out his career with spells at Arbroath and Montrose. Upon retiring, Arthur remained at Montrose as goalkeeping coach.

Honours
Raith Rovers
 Scottish First Division: 1
 1992–93

Forfar Athletic
 Scottish Third Division: 1
 1994–95

References

External links 
 
 More complete profile

1958 births
Footballers from Kirkcaldy
Living people
Dundee F.C. players
Stirling Albion F.C. players
Partick Thistle F.C. players
Dumbarton F.C. players
Raith Rovers F.C. players
Forfar Athletic F.C. players
Arbroath F.C. players
Montrose F.C. players
Scottish footballers
Scottish Football League players
Association football goalkeepers